The Renault Mégane, also spelled as Megane in some other languages, is a small family car produced by the French car manufacturer Renault for model year 1996, and was the successor to the Renault 19. The Mégane has been offered in three- and five-door hatchback, saloon, coupé, convertible and estate bodystyles at various points in its lifetime, and having been through four generations is now in its fifth incarnation.

The first generation was largely based on its predecessor, the 19, and utilized modified versions of that car's drivetrain and chassis. The second and third generations were based on the Renault–Nissan C platform. The fourth generation is based on the CMF-CD platform, as used by the Renault Talisman and Renault Scénic.

In November 1996, the Mégane Scénic compact MPV was introduced, using the same mechanical components as the hatchback Mégane. For 2002, the Mégane entered its second generation with a substantial redesign taking place, and was voted European Car of the Year for 2003, whilst also becoming the first car in its class to receive a five star Euro NCAP rating.

The Mégane entered its third generation in 2008, with another totally different design being used; the saloon version of the Mégane became known as the Renault Fluence for this generation, and it was introduced in 2009. The fourth-generation Mégane was launched in 2015, with sales commencing in 2016.

In 2021, Renault revealed a battery electric version known as the Megane E-Tech Electric, which takes on a crossover exterior design.

First generation (X64; 1995)

Development of the X64 began at the beginning of 1990, with the first sketches of X64 programme being drawn during the first six months of 1990. Very quickly, several themes were outlined and developed into four small scale (1/5) models by September 1990.

The designs retained were developed around four themes. Theme A: a six light version, evoking the Laguna; Theme B: a model with a markedly cuneiform line; Theme C: another design with ellipse shaped glasswork and rear notch; Theme D: a model with the same elliptical glazing and rounded rear.

In March 1991, all four styling proposals were developed into full scale (1:1). Theme C by Michel Jardin was chosen by Le Quement and frozen for production in April 1992. The first prototypes were built and presented to management in December 1992. Approximately 432 prototypes were built (at Rueil assembly) and destroyed during development.

In June 1993, Renault purchased production tooling for the X64, with the first test unit being assembled at the Douai plant in October 1994, and pre production units being constructed from December 1994 to the middle of 1995.

The Mégane I was unveiled in September 1995, at the Frankfurt Motor Show, as a replacement for the Renault 19. The car was essentially a reskin of its predecessor, and carried over the 19's floorpan, engines, transmissions and chassis design, albeit with much modification.

Taking its name from a Renault concept car shown in 1988, the Mégane further developed the new corporate styling theme introduced by Patrick Le Quément on the Laguna, most notably the "bird beak" front grille – a styling cue borrowed from the Renault 16 of the 1960s. Renault decided to add an acute accent to the vehicle name (Mégane), in order to assert its European identity, in a context of growing competition of newer car manufacturers coming from Japan.

As with the 19 and the 11 before it, the Mégane was produced at Renault's Douai plant in northern France starting in July 1995, and at the Spanish plant of Palencia. Market launch began on 15 November 1995 in France, and 15 December 1995 for the coupé. Sales in the United Kingdom commenced in April 1996.

Safety was a key focus of the Mégane I, Renault's first car reflecting their new focus of selling on safety.

It featured a pillar mounted three-point seatbelt for the middle rear occupant (replacing the common 'lap strap'), standard front belt pre tensioners and load limiters, driver's airbag (passenger airbag from 1996) and an impressive safety structure – a specification ahead of all rivals in 1995, e.g. VW Golf Mk 3, Opel Astra F, Ford Escort etc. Some features, such as the three-point middle belt, had debuted on the Renault 19 safety concept vehicle (and this feature entered production on the Renault Laguna before the Mégane).

The car also benefited from Renault's first "System for Restraint and Protection" (SRP), essentially a system of careful optimisation of occupant restraint by interaction of the seat, seatbelt, pretensioner, load limiter and airbag. The Mégane I achieved a best in class four star crash test rating in the 1998 round of testing by Euro NCAP.

November 1996 saw the introduction of the Mégane Scénic compact MPV.

Power came from the Renault E type ("Energy") engine in 1.4 L and 1.6 L, and the F-type unit in both 1.9 L diesel and 2.0 L petrol forms, although this time around there was a wider variety of 16 valve derivatives. A 1.9 L diesel engine in both normally aspirated and turbocharged forms was also available.

Renault also produced a limited number of Renaultsport edition Phase 1's with the Renaultsport bodywork; however, these were very rare. The Renaultsport kit was available to purchase for a short time direct from Renault France, but has now been discontinued, thus their value has increased.

The estate version of the original Mégane was only available in LHD form, with no RHD variants built. This could be due to the greater popularity of the Scenic in those markets, limiting the potential sales of a compact estate. The estate was added with the facelift of 1999, although pre-facelifted Mégane estates were sold from 1998 in Turkey, where it was manufactured.

In Japan, Renault was formerly licensed by Yanase Co., Ltd., but in 1999 Renault acquired a stake in Japanese automaker Nissan. As a result of Renault's purchase, Yanase canceled its licensing contract for all Renault models sold in Japan, including, but not limited to, the Mégane I, in 2000, and Nissan took over as the sole licensee for Renault cars.

Facelift
A mild facelift in spring 1999 gave the Mégane I a modified grille, more advanced safety features and upgraded equipment, and 16 valve engines were used across the range. An Estate body style was also launched in mainland Europe with the facelift. The production continued for the Latin America Market, where it was sold alongside the Mégane II line at a considerably lower price until 2011.

South America
In countries, such as Argentina and Colombia, the Mégane I was available until 2010, sold as a sedan and an estate, but in Venezuela, it was available only as a sedan. It features as the top line of the model the LA04 engine (16 valves, 1.6 litres and 110 HP), and was produced by both Renault Colombia and Renault Argentina, in where it was one of the best selling cars to date.

It is a car with more advanced safety features, upgraded equipment and more. The Mégane I had a lower price than the Mégane II.

In Venezuela, it was only available in one version: Unique, with a five-speed manual gearbox or a four-speed automatic one. Both of these were equipped with Abs and other extra equipment including driver and passenger front airbags, foglights, leather seats, electric mirrors and electric windows. In Argentina, not every version had features such as electric windows, electric mirrors or airbags.

Engines

Maxi Mégane

During the 1990s, Renault Sport developed a rally car for the Formula 2 Kit Car regulations. This was the Clio Williams Maxi, which was the first car truly developed for the F2 Kit Car category, and first appeared in 1996. However, rivals such as Citroën and Peugeot soon introduced bigger and more powerful cars, which resulted in Renault producing an F2 version of the Mégane in 1996. The Maxi Mégane officially represented the brand in French Championship rallies in 1996 and 1997 with drivers like Philippe Bugalski, Jean Ragnotti or Serge Jordan, and the British Rally Championship from 1996 to 1999, with Grégoire De Mévius, Alain Oreille, Robbie Head, Martin Rowe, and Tapio Laukkanen. Both the French and British rally teams also compete in the World Rally Championship.

After the works programme was discontinued, many privateers continued to use the car. It was also used in the FIA 2-Litre World Rally Cup, which Renault won in 1999. The car used a special version of the Renault F7R engine, and had a seven speed Sequential manual transmission.

Its most notable result was an outright victory in the 1996 Tour de Corse in the hands of Philippe Bugalski and his co driver Jean-Paul Chiaroni (in a year where the Tour de Corse was a FIA 2-Litre World Rally Cup only event); but it also helped Renault to the FIA 2 Litre World Rally Cup of Manufacturer's title in 1999.

In other high level competitions, Renault took back to back manufacturer's and driver's titles in the British Rally Championship in 1998 and 1999, whilst they also took the European Rally Championship in 1999.

Second generation (2002)

The Mégane II was launched in September 2002 for the 2003 model year, and marked a completely new fresh start. The two cars bear very little resemblance, the new vehicle having been inspired by the manufacturer's new design language first seen in the Avantime.

The new Mégane was voted European Car of the Year for 2003, fighting off stiff competition from Japan's Mazda 6 and PSA's Citroën C3, and achieved a five star safety rating in the Euro NCAP crash tests, the first small family car to do so.

The Mégane II and the Laguna were both showcases for a great deal of innovative technologies Renault launched at the beginning of the 2000s; the Renault Card keyless ignition system, standard on the Mégane II, was a first in this class and has since been widely adopted.

Similarly, the option of a panoramic glass sunroof is another area in which Renault led where others followed. In June 2003, the first ever live crash test using a real driver rather than a crash test dummy featuring the Mégane II was conducted by Top Gear.

In Brazil, Renault launched a flex fuel version, called "Hi-Flex", which is able to run either with unleaded gasoline (petrol) or ethanol. Like the Brazilian Scénic and Clio versions, the Mégane's engine can work with any mix of gasoline and ethanol, due to the use of an electronic control module.

The Megane ll sedan was assembled in Iran by Pars Khodro from 2008 to 2013.

The flex version has a 16V 109 hp (110 PS) (113 hp (115 PS) with ethanol) 1.6-litre inline-four engine developed and produced in Brazil, but the 2.0 litre version does not allow ethanol use, because its engine is made in France.

As with the previous Mégane, the range of models is wide; there is a three and five door hatchback available, named "Sport Hatch" and "Hatch" respectively, there is a four-door saloon/sedan (Sport Saloon), a five-door estate (Sport Tourer / Grandtour), and to replace both the Mégane Coupe and Convertible, a new retractable hardtop coupe designed by Karmann.

Unlike its predecessor, the Mégane II was not licensed by Yanase Co., Ltd. for the Japanese market, as Renault had acquired a stake in Nissan when the Mégane I was still in production. Instead, the Mégane II was licensed by Nissan Motor Co., Ltd. and sold exclusively through Nissan Red Stage Store locations.

Mégane RS

The RenaultSport (RS) versions of the three door and five door Mégane hatchbacks were introduced, equipped with a turbocharged petrol 2.0 L 16v engine producing  and Turbocharged diesel 2.0L dCi 16V engine producing 175 PS (129 kW;173 hp). Along with the engine, changes were made to the front and rear suspension geometry to improve handling, and the model features a deeper, wider front bumper. The Mégane Renault Sport competes in the hot hatch segment of the market.

Facelift
The Hatchback model was revised at Motor Show Brussels in January 2006, the Wagon and Convertible model was debut at Geneva Motor Show in March 2006, with changes in interior trim (e.g. a new revised instrument cluster with the speedometer moved to the right and the tachometer moved to the left), specification levels and most notably, a new front nose. A new front suspension system borrowed from the Mégane 2.0  was adopted, improving the driving performance. Also, the Nissan Sentra B16 is based on the platform from 2006 of the Renault Mégane.

Engines

Reception
During its first full year of sales, the Mégane II topped the French sales charts, with 198,874 registered in 2003. It has also sold very well in Britain, being the nation's fourth most popular car in 2005 and the nation's fifth most popular car in 2004 and 2006. In 2007, however, it dipped to eighth place, with just over 55,000 examples being sold.

Thanks to the locally assembled 4-door model, the Mégane has been the best-selling car in Turkey from 2004 to 2006.

In January 2011, it was reported that the Mégane II had the highest rate of MOT failures in the United Kingdom for cars first taking the test in 2007. While in German ADAC breakdown statistics, the Mégane scored very well, surpassing such cars as the Ford Focus, Honda Civic and Opel/Vauxhall Astra. The model of 2008 achieved third place in its class, after the BMW 1 Series and Audi A3.

Third generation (2008)

The third generation was launched in the end of 2008, to keep the range competitive. In October 2008, both the five door hatchback and Mégane Coupé were officially put on sale. The two models have different designs; the Coupé has a sporty design, while the five door model is more conservative.

No automatic transmission is offered, with it being replaced by a continuously variable transmission.

A five-door estate version was introduced in June 2009, and was named the Sport Tourer. Another addition to the range came in the form of the Coupé Cabriolet in June 2010. That year also saw the addition of a 1.4 L turbocharged engine being added to the range.

Production of the Mégane's saloon derivative, the Fluence, began in Argentina in 2011, at the firm's Córdoba plant. The Mégane III was also made available for sale in Argentina that year, but was produced in Turkey, and imported into the country. In Brazil, the Fluence replaced the Mégane in Renault's lineup from 2011 onwards.

The Mégane III underwent its first facelift in January 2012, which also introduced three new engines; a 1.2 L turbocharged petrol engine, a new  version of the 1.5 L dCi engine, and a new 1.6 L dCi engine.

Another facelift followed for 2014, with a more powerful  version of the 1.2 L turbocharged engine going on sale, whilst the styling of the hatchback, coupé and estate versions was updated to match Renault's new model range.

Later that year, a  version of the 2.0 L turbocharged petrol engine was added to the range.

Higher specification Mégane feature the same 2.0 dCi engine as the Mégane II. However, after 2015 the 2.0 dCi was no longer offered.

Special editions

Mégane Olympic
The Mégane Olympic is a special edition launched in August 2012 on the occasion of the London 2012 Olympic Games.

Engines

Fourth generation (BFB; 2016)

The fourth generation Mégane was launched at the September 2015 Frankfurt Motor Show, with sales starting in July 2016. The vehicle is larger and based on an all-new CMF-CD platform shared with the Renault Scénic and Renault Talisman. The Mégane IV follows the latest design language, which has been seen on the Clio IV, Captur, Espace V and Talisman.

An estate version (Mégane Sport Tourer/Grand tour, codenamed KFB) was revealed at the 2016 Geneva Motor Show. The four door fastback saloon version called the Mégane Sedan later in July of the same year.

Technical details
The fourth generation Mégane is larger and lower than its predecessor. The suspension is made of MacPherson struts on the front and a torsion beam on the rear. Brakes are discs on both axles. The driver can select between five driving modes that change the car set up.

Most Mégane's models have a head up display and a seven-inch screen (replaced with an 8.7-inch touchscreen in some trim levels).

Options include adaptive cruise control, automated emergency braking, lane departure warning, speed limit warning, blind spot monitoring, automatic headlights, reversing camera, parking sensors and a hands free parking system.

Speaking about the car, Renault's chief designer Laurens van den Acker said, "Renault can produce cars with a Latin skin and a German heart".

Mégane Sedan
The Renault Mégane Sedan, launched in July 2016, resembles the Talisman, but with the front section of the Mégane IV hatchback and a fastback like sloping roofline. It has more space for the back seat passengers than the hatchback and a larger boot, with a claimed volume of 508 litre.

It is sold on the African continent, the Middle East, various Eastern Asian and Australian markets. Within Europe, it is offered in several countries including Turkey, Italy, Poland, Romania, Bulgaria, Ukraine, Serbia, Greece, Georgia and Ireland, but neither France or the United Kingdom.

Depending on the market, there are two petrol engines and three diesel engines offered, with power outputs ranging from 90 to 130 bhp. Only the mid range engine is suitable to be matched with the dual clutch six speed transmission.

The Mégane Sedan is facelifted in February 2021, some months after the hatchback and the estate. It receives a new 115 hp petrol engine.

Mégane GT 
The Mégane GT is a high performance version based on the hatchback model with 1.6-litre I4 diesel and petrol powertrains. As standard, it incorporates a four-wheel steering system (4Control) and dual-clutch automatic gearbox with optional paddle shifting. It also has a slightly different design for the interior and the exterior.

Mégane R.S.
The Mégane R.S. was introduced in September 2017 and went on sale in 2018. Based on the hatchback model, it is powered by a 1.8-litre turbocharged engine from the previous generation, with tweaks done by Renault F1 engineers. The engine produces  and  torque, with an option of two transmissions, which are six-speed manual or a six-speed dual-clutch automatic.

The Renault Megane R.S. will be discontinued in 2023.

Mégane RS Trophy Limited Edition
Renault announced in December 2022 the limited edition Megane RS Trophy for Japan, which will be unveiled at the Tokyo Auto Salon.

Mégane R.S Trophy-R 

The Mégane R.S Trophy-R was launched in July 2019. Resembles a track racing version of the Mégane RS Trophy, it was developed using Renault Sport's motorsport expertise resulting in the fastest ever front-wheel drive production car lap of the Nurburgring at  7 mins 40.1 seconds.

Only 500 Trophy-R cars were made, 30 of which will be fitted with the optional carbon ceramic brakes and rims.

Mégane RS Ultime 
Before being discontinued, the Renault Mégane RS will be available in 2024 in a limited edition named Ultime. A photo showing the livery was leaked on the web in November 2022.

Facelift
In 2020, the Mégane was refreshed with facelift, with minor changes to the exterior design, a 9.3-inch touchscreen, and a plug-in hybrid version in both estate and hatchback variants marketed as the Mégane E-Tech.

Megane E-Tech Electric 

The Megane E-Tech Electric is a battery electric car using the Megane nameplate that was launched in February 2022. It is built on a dedicated electric vehicle platform called the CMF-EV.

Nameplate usage

Mégane Scénic 

In 1996, a compact MPV called the Mégane Scénic was introduced. It was renamed to Scénic during a facelift in 1999.

Mégane Conquest 

In September 2020, the rebadged version of the South Korean-made Renault Samsung XM3/Arkana was launched in former Yugoslavian countries as the Mégane Conquest due to negative connotations with the Serbian historical war criminal Arkan.

See also
 Mégane Renault Sport
 Renault Fluence
 Renault Scénic

Notes

External links

  (UK)
  (Sport Tourer: UK)

Megane
Compact cars
Sedans
Coupés
Euro NCAP small family cars
Hatchbacks
Convertibles
Hardtop convertibles
Front-wheel-drive vehicles
Plug-in hybrid vehicles
2000s cars
2010s cars
Cars introduced in 1995
Rally cars
Cars of Brazil
Cars of Turkey